The discography of Rick Ross, an American rapper, consists of 11 studio albums, one compilation album, 145 singles (including 100 as a featured artist), one soundtrack, and 40 music videos. Ross's debut studio album, Port of Miami (2006), features two singles with "Hustlin'" and "Push It". Ross's second studio album, Trilla (2008), produced hit singles such as "The Boss" (featuring T-Pain) and "Here I Am" (features Nelly and Avery Storm). Ross's third studio album, Deeper Than Rap (2009), includes the singles such as "Magnificent" (featuring John Legend) and "Maybach Music 2" (featuring Kanye West, Lil Wayne, and T-Pain). Ross's fourth studio album, Teflon Don (2010), includes the hit single, "Aston Martin Music" (featuring Drake and Chrisette Michele).

Ross has also appeared on many other artist's singles and tracks, including "All I Do Is Win" (also featuring Ludacris, Snoop Dogg, and T-Pain) and "I'm On One" (also featuring Drake and Lil Wayne) by DJ Khaled. The latter peaked at number 10 on the Hot 100, becoming Ross' most successful song to date, and was also nominated at the 54th Annual Grammy Awards.

Albums

Studio albums

Compilation albums

Collaborative albums

Soundtrack albums

Extended plays

Mixtapes

Singles

As lead artist

As featured artist

Promotional singles

Other charted and certified songs

Production discography

Other guest appearances

Music videos

As lead artist

Notes

References

External links 
 Official website
 Rick Ross at AllMusic
 
 

Hip hop discographies
Discographies of American artists